The Hall of Fame Tip Off is an NCAA-exempt tournament organized by the Naismith Basketball Hall of Fame and is sponsored by the Metro Atlantic Athletic Conference. It features four team NCAA Division I men’s basketball teams. The tournament takes place at the Mohegan Sun Arena in Uncasville, Connecticut. Under the previous format teams were separated into two divisions, the Springfield and Naismith. Each division had 4 teams.

History

Champions

Brackets 
* – Denotes overtime period

2011

Naismith Division

Springfield Division

2012

Naismith Division

Springfield Division

2013

Naismith Division

Springfield Division

2014

Naismith Division

Springfield Division

2015

Naismith Bracket

Springfield Bracket

2016

Naismith Bracket

Springfield Bracket

2017

Naismith Bracket

Springfield Bracket

2018

Naismith Bracket

Springfield Bracket

2019

Naismith Bracket

Springfield Bracket

2021

2022

References

External links
Official website

College basketball competitions
College men's basketball competitions in the United States
Tip
Recurring sporting events established in 2011
2011 establishments in Connecticut
Basketball in Connecticut